Lily Kronberger (12 November 1890 – 21 May 1974), also spelled Lili Kronberger,  was a Hungarian figure skater competitive during the early years of modern figure skating. She was Hungary’s first World Champion.

Early life
Kronberger was born in Budapest in 1890 as the youngest child and only daughter of Miksa Kronberger (1857-1902), a lumber merchant, and Janka Kreisler (1867-1927).

Career
Kronberger won a World bronze medal in 1906, at the first official World Championships to include a ladies' event.

She won bronze again in 1907, and four gold medals from 1908 to 1911."
She was the first athlete to win a world championship gold for Hungary.

At the 1911 championship in Vienna, she caused a stir by bringing a military band along to play during her free skating program, which included a "clear interpretation" of the music she used, even though the use of music during international figure skatine competitions was rare at the time. 

Later in 1911, she married Imre Szent-Györgyi and retired from competition, handing the baton over to Opika Méray Horváth.

She died in Budapest in 1974, at the age of 83.

Halls of Fame
Kronberger, who was Jewish, was inducted into the International Jewish Sports Hall of Fame in 1983.

She was inducted into the World Figure Skating Hall of Fame in 1997.

Results

*Co-ed competition from 1900–1922

See also
List of select Jewish figure skaters

References

International Jewish Sports Hall of Fame – Lili Kronberger
"From the Ghetto to the Games: Jewish Athletes in Hungary," 1985

External links
Skating in Hungary 2004 European Figure Skating Championships

Navigation

Figure skaters from Budapest
1890 births
1974 deaths
Hungarian female single skaters
World Figure Skating Championships medalists
Jewish Hungarian sportspeople